Uspallata is a village and administrative district in Argentina, in a scenic location on the road that crosses the Andes between Mendoza and Santiago in Chile. There are several items of interest in and around the village including "las bovedas," somewhat strangely egg-shaped kilns dating from the early 17th century which were used to extract gold, silver, zinc, copper and other metals from minerals mined nearby. Worth a brief visit as they are only approx  from town, complete with a small museum, notes include the fact that some of the refractory bricks can still be seen with "Rufford Stourbridge" from the English West Midlands stamped on them; a brief reminder of Britain's industrial heritage. There is a brief glimpse of the stunning mountain from the road some distance from another point of interest, an ochre coloured bridge spanning the Mendoza River  from Uspallata that seems to have been made from sulphur-bearing hot springs.

Uspallata is served by Uspallata Airport.

Geography

Climate
Summers have pleasant days and cool nights, and winters are chilly to cold, with the possibility of snowfall.

References

Populated places in Mendoza Province
Cities in Argentina
Argentina
Mendoza Province